The Committee on Industry, Research and Energy (ITRE) is a committee of the European Parliament. Its areas of responsibility relate to industry, especially technology-intensive manufacturing, information technology, and telecommunications. It also coordinates European space policy and therefore has ties with the European Space Agency. It has oversight duties in relation to the Joint Research Centre and the Institute for Reference Materials and Measurements, as well as similar projects. In the past, the ITRE committee also dealt with transport matters. However this policy field has been transferred over to a dedicated Parliament's Committee on Transport and Tourism.

The committee's current chair is Cristian Bușoi.

Energy policy 
One major area of activity for the committee is energy policy, safety, and efficiency. They monitor compliance with the Euratom Treaty around nuclear waste disposal.
The Paris Agreement and, more recently, the launch of the European Green Deal have put climate change and the energy transition center-stage. Policies to support clean technologies such as renewable energy or hydrogen have been advanced through the committee.

In 2022, the committee will be in charge of negotiating the European Commission's proposal for on the directive on the energy performance of buildings and the energy efficiency directive.

Regulations 
As of March 2014 ITRE committee is the lead charge for regulations dealing with "European single market for electronic communications". The proposals were put forward by Neelie Kroes. A collective of NGOs considered this regulation could damage net neutrality.

List of chairpersons

Committee Bureau

7th term 
Chair
 Amalia Sartori (EPP; Italy): 2012–2014.

8th term 
Chair
 Jerzy Buzek (EPP; Poland)

9th term 
Elected on 10 July 2019.
Chair
 Adina-Ioana Vălean (EPP; Romania)
1st Vice-Chair
 Zdzisław Krasnodębski (ECR; Poland)
2nd Vice-Chair
 Morten Petersen (RE, Denmark)
3rd Vice-Chair
 Patrizia Toia (S&D, Italy)
4th Vice-Chair 
 Lina Gálvez Muñoz (S&D, Spain)

References

External links
Official Homepage

Industry
C